The 1980 NCAA Division I basketball tournament involved 48 schools playing in single-elimination play to determine the national champion of men's  NCAA Division I college basketball. It began on March 6, 1980, and ended with the championship game on March 24 at Market Square Arena in Indianapolis. A total of 48 games were played, including a national third-place game.

Louisville, coached by Denny Crum, won the national title with a 59–54 victory in the final game over UCLA, coached by Larry Brown. Darrell Griffith of Louisville was named the tournament's Most Outstanding Player.

Structurally speaking, this was the first tournament of the modern era. For the first time:
 An unlimited number of at-large teams could come from any conference. (From 1975 to 1979, conferences were allowed only one at-large entry.)
 The bracket was seeded to make each region as evenly competitive as possible. (Previously, geographic considerations had trumped this.)
 All teams were seeded solely based on the subjective judgment of the committee. (In 1979, seeding was partially based on the prior performance of a conference winner's conference.)

In the 2nd year the tournament field was seeded, no #1 seed reached the Final 4. This would not happen again until 2006 and also occurred in 2011.

UCLA would forfeit its second place in the standings in 1981 after players representing the school were declared ineligible by the NCAA.

Schedule and venues

The following are the sites that were selected to host each round of the 1980 tournament:

First and Second Rounds
March 6 and 8
East Region
 Greensboro Memorial Coliseum, Greensboro, North Carolina
Mideast Region
 Mackey Arena, West Lafayette, Indiana
Midwest Region
 Bob Devaney Sports Center, Lincoln, Nebraska
West Region
 Dee Events Center, Ogden, Utah
March 7 and 9
East Region
 Providence Civic Center, Providence, Rhode Island
Mideast Region
 E.A. Diddle Arena, Bowling Green, Kentucky
Midwest Region
 UNT Coliseum, Denton, Texas
West Region
 ASU Activity Center, Tempe, Arizona

Regional semifinals and finals (Sweet Sixteen and Elite Eight)
March 13 and 15
Mideast Regional, Rupp Arena, Lexington, Kentucky
West Regional, McKale Center, Tucson, Arizona
March 14 and 16
East Regional, The Spectrum, Philadelphia, Pennsylvania
Midwest Regional, The Summit, Houston, Texas

National semifinals, 3rd-place game, and championship (Final Four and championship)
March 22 and 24
Market Square Arena, Indianapolis, Indiana

For the 1st time, Indianapolis was the host of the Final 4; the next 6 held in the city were held at either the RCA Dome or at Lucas Oil Stadium. The Midwest Regional at The Summit marked the 4th different venue to host Tournament games in the city of Houston; a 5th location, NRG Stadium, was introduced in 2008. The city holds the record for the most different venues used. Only Indianapolis has had 4 venues utilized as of this tournament and would not hit a 5th until 2021, when its current NBA arena, Bankers Life  Fieldhouse, was used. 3 different venues hosted games for the first time, all on college campuses; of the 3, Purdue's Mackey Arena repeated as a host in 2021.

Teams

Bracket
* – Denotes overtime period.

East region

Midwest region

Mideast region

West region

Final Four

Announcers
 Dick Enberg, Billy Packer, and Al McGuire – Mideast Regional Final at Lexington, Kentucky; Midwest Regional Final at Houston, Texas; Final Four at Indianapolis, Indiana 
 Don Criqui and Gary Thompson – East Regional Final at Philadelphia, Pennsylvania; West Regional Final at Tucson, Arizona
 Bill O'Donnell and Bucky Waters – East Regional semifinals at Philadelphia, Pennsylvania
 Fred White and Larry Conley – Mideast Regional semifinals at Lexington, Kentucky
 Jay Randolph and Jeff Mullins – Midwest Regional semifinals at Houston, Texas
 Dick Enberg and Al McGuire – Second Round at Lincoln, Nebraska (Louisville–Kansas State, Notre Dame–Missouri); Second Round at Tempe, Arizona (DePaul–UCLA, Ohio State–Arizona State)
 Don Criqui and Billy Packer – Second Round at West Lafayette, Indiana (St. John's–Purdue, Duke–Pennsylvania); Second Round at Bowling Green, Kentucky (Indiana–Virginia Tech, Kentucky–Florida State)
 Merle Harmon and Joe Dean – Second Round at Greensboro, North Carolina (North Carolina State–Iowa, Maryland–Tennessee)
 Bob Costas and Bucky Waters – Second Round at Providence, Rhode Island (Georgetown–Iona, Syracuse–Villanova)
 Charlie Jones and Lynn Shackelford – Second Round at Ogden, Utah (Brigham Young–Clemson, Oregon State–Lamar)
 Jay Randolph and Gary Thompson – First round at Lincoln, Nebraska (Kansas State–Arkansas, Missouri–San Jose State); Second Round at Denton, Texas (LSU–Alcorn State, North Carolina–Texas A&M)

See also
 1980 NCAA Division II basketball tournament
 1980 NCAA Division III basketball tournament
 1980 National Invitation Tournament
 1980 NAIA Division I men's basketball tournament
 1980 National Women's Invitation Tournament

References

NCAA Division I men's basketball tournament
 
NCAA
Basketball in Houston
NCAA
NCAA Division I men's basketball tournament
NCAA Division I men's basketball tournament